Augustine is a surname. Notable people with the name include:

 Alan Augustine (died 2001), American politician
 Ann Augustine (born 1988), Indian film actress
 Anthony Augustine (born 1980), Grenadian footballer
 Brendan Augustine (born 1971), South African footballer
 Chike Augustine (born 1992), Trinidad and Tobago basketball player
 Dave Augustine (born 1949), American baseball outfielder
 David Augustine Jr. or Dee-1, American rapper
 Erika F. Augustine, American pediatric neurologist
 James Augustine (born 1984), American basketball player
 Jean Augustine, (born 1937), Canadian politician
 Jerry Augustine (born 1952), American baseball pitcher
 Joe Mike Augustine (1911–1995), First Nations leader and historian of the Metepenagiag Mi'kmaq Nation, grandfather of Noah Augustine
 Kathy Augustine (1956–2006), first female state controller of Nevada
 Michael Augustine (disambiguation), several people
 Noah Augustine (1971–2010), Canadian First Nations activist, grandson of Joe Mike Augustine
 Norman R. Augustine (born 1935), American aviation engineer/businessman
 Parnelia Augustine (1884–1960), American painter
 Roshy Augustine (born 1969), Indian politician
 Steve Augustine (born 1977), British Virgin Islands Olympic athlete
 Steve Augustine (musician), Canadian rock drummer, member of Thousand Foot Krutch

See also 
 Kif Augustine-Adams (born 1964), professor of law at Brigham Young University's law school
 Augustin (name), given name and surname
 Augustine (given name)
Surnames from given names